In Greek mythology, Sidero (Ancient Greek: Σιδηρώ means "the Iron One") was the second wife of King Salmoneus of Elis and stepmother of Tyro, whom she mistreated. Pelias and Neleus, Tyro's twin sons, sought revenge when they reached adulthood. Although Sidero fled from them into Hera's district, Pelias nevertheless murdered her atop the altar to Hera, earning the goddess' undying hatred in the process.

Notes

Reference 

 Apollodorus, The Library with an English Translation by Sir James George Frazer, F.B.A., F.R.S. in 2 Volumes, Cambridge, MA, Harvard University Press; London, William Heinemann Ltd. 1921. ISBN 0-674-99135-4. Online version at the Perseus Digital Library. Greek text available from the same website.

Queens in Greek mythology